Tanganyika was a colonial territory in East Africa which was administered by the United Kingdom in various guises from 1916 to 1961. It was initially administered under a military occupation regime. From 20 July 1922, it was formalised into a League of Nations mandate under British rule. From 1946, it was administered by the UK as a United Nations trust territory.

Before World War I, Tanganyika formed part of the German colony of German East Africa. It was gradually occupied by forces from the British Empire and Belgian Congo during the East Africa Campaign, although German resistance continued until 1918. After this, the League of Nations formalised the UK's control of the area, who renamed it "Tanganyika". The UK held Tanganyika as a League of Nations mandate until the end of World War II after which it was held as a United Nations trust territory. In 1961, Tanganyika gained its independence from the UK as Tanganyika. It became a republic a year later. Tanganyika now forms part of the modern-day sovereign state of Tanzania.

Etymology
The name of the territory was taken from the large lake in its west. Henry Morton Stanley had found the name of "Tanganika", when he travelled to Ujiji in 1876. He wrote that the locals were not sure about its meaning and conjectured that it meant something like "the great lake spreading out like a plain", or "plain-like lake".

The name was chosen by the British with the Treaty of Versailles, and as such the name took effect when Britain was given control of Tanganyika in 1920. Britain needed a new name to replace "Deutsch Ostafrika" or "German East Africa". Various names were considered, including "Smutsland" in honour of General Jan Smuts (denied for being "inelegant"), "Eburnea," "New Maryland," "Windsorland" after the British Royal Family's new family name, and "Victoria" after both the Lake and the Queen. The Colonial Secretary insisted that "a native name prominently associated with the territory" be selected. "Kilimanjaro", analogous to "Kenya," named after the country's highest mountain, and "Tabora", after the town and trading centre near the geographical centre of the country, were proposed and rejected. Then, the deputy undersecretary to the Colonial Secretary proposed "Tanganyika Protectorate" after Lake Tanganyika; the name was modified after a "junior official suggested that 'Territory' was more in accordance with the [League of Nations mandate]" and that was adopted.

History

The area that made up Tanganyika was commonly visited by Arabic traders who would come to the area to buy slaves and ivory. The island of Zanzibar was even taken as a part of the Sultanate of Oman, when Seyyid Said came to power in 1806, Omani interests in Tanzania began to increase. During the early 19th century, with British support, Oman began developing in the region more closely to prevent French growth in the Indian ocean and grow Oman’s wealth and influence. Trade caravans began venturing further into the continent, connecting the coast and the interior together. In some areas, Islam became adopted by the native peoples such as the Yao in the south of the country. Islam has continued to be a major religion within the area, with 36% of Tanzanian population adhering to Islam.

In the second half of the 19th century, European explorers and colonialists travelled through the African interior from Zanzibar. In 1885, the German Empire declared its intent to establish a protectorate in the area, named German East Africa (GEA), under the leadership of Carl Peters. When the Sultan of Zanzibar objected, German warships threatened to bombard his palace. Britain and Germany then agreed to divide the mainland into spheres of influence, and the Sultan was forced to acquiesce. The Germans brutally repressed the Maji Maji Rebellion of 1905. The German colonial administration instituted an educational programme for native Africans, including elementary, secondary, and vocational schools.

The German colonial administrations developed the colony through several means. Cultivation of several profitable cash crops such as cotton, sisal, coco and coffee were important to developing the colony as these resources were used for German consumers and industry. Sisal, was especially valuable to rope production, and was one of German East Africa’s largest exports. In 1893 there was only one Sisal plantation in the country, by 1913 there were 54. At the end of 1913, the country exported over 20,000 tons of sisal, making up 30% of their total exports. To ensure that these resources could be moved easily, several railways were built. The most important of which was the Central Line or Mittellandbahn, which connected much of the country towards the port city of Dar es Salam. This railroad is still in use today and has since been connected to other railways across the country.

After the defeat of Germany during World War I, GEA was divided among the victorious powers under the Treaty of Versailles. Apart from Ruanda-Urundi (assigned to Belgium) and the small Kionga Triangle (assigned to Portuguese Mozambique), the territory was transferred to British control. "Tanganyika" was adopted by the British as the name for its part of the former German East Africa.

In 1927, Tanganyika entered the Customs Union of the East Africa Protectorate and the Uganda Protectorate, which eventually became the independent countries of Kenya and Uganda, and the East African Postal Union, later the East African Posts and Telecommunications Administration. Cooperation expanded with those protectorates and, later, countries in a number of ways, leading to the establishment of the East African High Commission (1948–1961) and the East African Common Services Organisation (1961–1967), forerunners of the East African Community. The country held its first elections in 1958 and 1959. The following year it was granted internal self-government and fresh elections were held. Both elections were won by the Tanganyika African National Union (TANU), which led the country to independence in December 1961. The following year a presidential election was held, with TANU leader Julius Nyerere emerging victorious. In the mid-20th century, Tanganyika was the largest producer of beeswax in the world.

The British state took control of the colony of Tanganyika as a result of the Treaty of Versailles. Once Britain took control of the colony, they wished it to be a "Black man's country". The British state wished for this colony to be similar to the Nigeria in terms of its state structure. And as the policy of colonial rule in Nigeria changed to indirect rule so too did the governance of Tanganyika. The British also pursued an anti-German policy which was led by the head official in Tanganyika, Sir Horace Bryatt. Bryatt was an unpopular politician, and his policies of expelling Germans halved Tanganyika's population. Many of the ex-German plantations were sold to European companies and mixed farms were given to new British owners. Much of Tanganyika's economy was based around cash crops, in particular Coffee.

British rule did have positives for the Asian community living in Tanganyika, as they were protected by the Britain as they were no longer attacked as they were during the war. Many of them were employed from the Indian administration to work for the Tanganyikan administration. This led to the Asian population in Tanganyika increasing from 8,698 in 1912 to 25,144 in 1931.

One of the major drivers for decolonisation in Tanganyika was TANU which was founded in 1954, led by Julius Nyerere. In 1963, TANU opened its doors to all members of society within Tanganyika, whereas it had previously only been open to Africans.

The success of TANU can be seen in the 1958 election under colonial rule where TANU candidates or TANU-supported candidates won every seat. The majority of the voters in Tanganyika were African, approximately two-thirds of the 28,500 registered voters, with them coming from across the country.

There was some resistance, though, from the British settlers who established the United Tanganyikan Party (UTP) by Brian Willis in 1956. However, the party became redundant as it was clear that Nyerere and TANU were going to win the battle over Tanganyikan independence. UTP was less effective due to the £4,000 annual salary for Willis which limited the party’s effectiveness, as they lacked funds to campaign effectively.

Tanganyika eventually gained its independence on 9 December 1961, after Nyerere had met a British government representative to arrange the steps to be taken on the road to independence.

Notable people 
 Julius Nyerere (1922–1999), an anti-colonial activist, politician and political theorist
 Vasant Tapu (1936–1988), a Tanzanian cricketer
 Ebrahim Hussein (born 1943), a Tanzanian playwright and poet
 Sir Clive Christopher Hugh Elliott, 4th Baronet of Limpsfield (1945–2018), an ornithologist and international civil servant
 Usha Sunak, a pharmacist and mother of Rishi. She was born in Tanganyika. 
 Dudley Seaton (1953–1978), son of Alberta Jones Seaton, a zoologist, involved in African independence movements
 Juma Mkambi (1955–2010), a Tanzanian footballer
 Tim Macartney-Snape (born 1956), a mountaineer and author
 Kipruto Rono Arap Kirwa (born 1957), a Kenyan politician

Tanganyikan independence 

The British colony of Tanganyika gained independence on 9 December 1961, with Julius Nyerere becoming first, its prime minister in 1960 under British rule, and then president when Tanganyika was declared a republic in 1962. The main leader of the independence movement was undoubtedly Nyerere, who led the party TANU, which was a socially diverse group which had shared demands for independence from Britain. TANU gained most of its political support through national issues. For example, TANU, discussed and promoted fears that the colonial state had attempted to give a disproportionate amount of power to the European and Asian minority groups living within Tanganyika. This would have undermined the entire basis of Tanganyika independence. TANU installed a deep-rooted fear within the African population that the colonialists might still rule or have influence, even after independence.

Challenges after independence 

Although independence came peacefully for Tanganyika, the country suffered from similar problems with many other post-colonial African countries such as poor financial resources and inadequate levels of infrastructure. However, two of the main factors that burdened Tanganyika’s independence was its geography and its surrounding neighbours. The destabilizing conflicts that bordered Tanganyika meant that refugees from the Congo, Burundi, and Rwanda often flooded into Tanganyika. The influx of refugees was a huge issue for Tanganyika so soon after independence. These challenges only emphasized the insecurities of Tanganyika and its people. In addition, Nyerere's growing emphasis on modernisation and his African socialist ideology known as Ujamaa saw many rural farmers' livelihoods destroyed by encroaching agriculturalists. 
In 1964, after the Zanzibar Revolution which saw the Arab rule of Zanzibar overthrown, Tanganyika merged with Zanzibar to become the United Republic of Tanganyika and Zanzibar, which later became known as the United Republic of Tanzania on 26 April 1964.

See also

List of colonial heads of Tanganyika
Tanganyika groundnut scheme

References

Further reading 
 
 Gordon-Brown, A. (editor), The East Africa Year Book and Guide, London, 1954, 87pps, with maps.
 Hill, J.F.R., and Moffett, J.P., Tanganyika – a Review of its Resources and their Development, published by the Government of Tanganyika, 1955, 924pps, with many maps.
 
 Moffett, J.P., Handbook of Tanganyika, published by the Government of Tanganyika, 1958, 703pps, with maps.
 Mwakikagile, Godfrey, Life in Tanganyika in The Fifties, New Africa Press, 2008, 428pps, with maps and photos.

External links 
The British Empire – Tanganyika

 
1922 establishments in Africa
1922 establishments in the British Empire
1961 disestablishments in Africa
Former colonies in Africa
States and territories disestablished in 1961
States and territories established in 1919
United Nations trust territories